Ihor Chervynskyy (Ігор Червинський, also spelled Igor Chervynskiy, born 16 December 1981) is a Ukrainian swimmer who competes in the freestyle events. At the 2003 World Aquatics Championships he won a bronze medal in the 800 metres, and a silver medal in the 1500 metres.

Biography
He competed in the pool twice at the Olympics, at the 2000 Summer Games, where he finished 33rd in the men's 400m freestyle and 7th in the men's 1500m freestyle, and at the 2004 Summer Games, where he finished 10th in the men's 1500m.

Since then, he has competed in open water swimming.  At the 2008 Summer Olympics, he competed in the Men's 10 km, finishing in 12th place.  At the 2012 Summer Olympics, he competed in the Men's 10 km, finishing in 14th.

He was born in Kharkiv, Ukraine.

References

External links
 

1981 births
Living people
Sportspeople from Kharkiv
Ukrainian male long-distance swimmers
Ukrainian male freestyle swimmers
Swimmers at the 2000 Summer Olympics
Swimmers at the 2004 Summer Olympics
Swimmers at the 2008 Summer Olympics
Swimmers at the 2012 Summer Olympics
World Aquatics Championships medalists in swimming
Medalists at the FINA World Swimming Championships (25 m)
European Aquatics Championships medalists in swimming
Universiade medalists in swimming
Universiade silver medalists for Ukraine
Universiade bronze medalists for Ukraine
Olympic swimmers of Ukraine
Medalists at the 2003 Summer Universiade
Medalists at the 2005 Summer Universiade
Kharkiv State College of Physical Culture 1 alumni
21st-century Ukrainian people